Guljan.org was a Kazakh news website. An opposition news source, it was owned by Gulzhan Yergaliyev. In July 2012, the website was reportedly subject to "massive hacking attacks over a week." It has since shut down.

See also
Media of Kazakhstan

References

External links

Kazakhstani news websites